Emporia is a city in and the county seat of Lyon County, Kansas, United States.  As of the 2020 census, the population of the city was 24,139.  Emporia lies between Topeka and Wichita at the intersection of U.S. Route 50 with Interstates 335 and 35 on the Kansas Turnpike.  Emporia is also a college town, home to Emporia State University and Flint Hills Technical College.  It is home of two annual sporting events: Unbound Gravel (gravel bicycle races) and Dynamic Discs Open (disc golf tournaments).

History

Located on upland prairie, Emporia was founded in 1857, drawing its name from ancient Carthage, a place known in history as a prosperous center of commerce.

In 1864 the Union Pacific Railway, Southern Branch (later incorporated into the Missouri-Kansas-Texas Railroad) received land grants to build from Fort Riley to Emporia. The road eventually reached Emporia in 1869, becoming the first railroad to serve the burgeoning town. In July 1870, a second railroad, the Atchison, Topeka and Santa Fe Railway reached Emporia, and in the years following the American Civil War the city became a booming railroad hub. In 1888, railroad executive and educator John Byers Anderson donated his personal library to the College of Emporia to commemorate his 50th wedding anniversary, and his former mentee Andrew Carnegie donated additional funds to build a library in Anderson's honor (conditioned upon the new college paying off its mortgage).

In 1953, Emporia was the site of the first Veterans Day observance in the United States.  At the urging of local shoe cobbler Alvin J. King, U.S. Representative Edward Rees introduced legislation in The United States Congress to rename Armistice Day as Veterans Day. President Dwight D. Eisenhower signed the bill into law on October 8, 1954.

On June 8, 1974, an F4 tornado struck Emporia, killing six people, injuring 200 people, and causing $25 million in damages.

On Sunday, March 6, 1988 a heavily armed gunman walked into the Calvary Baptist Church during services and opened fire.  The 29-year-old gunman, Cheunphon Ji, had no particular target, killing one person and injuring four others.

Geography
Emporia is located in east-central Kansas. The Neosho River flows along the northern side of the city. The Cottonwood River, one of its tributaries, flows along the city's southern edge and of two large city parks, Peter Pan and Soden's Grove; the two rivers meet near the eastern boundary of Emporia and flow southeast to join the Arkansas River in Oklahoma.

Climate
Annual snowfall averages .

Demographics

Emporia is the principal city of the Emporia Micropolitan Statistical Area, which includes all of Lyon and Chase counties.

2010 census
As of the 2010 census, there were 24,916 people, 9,812 households, and 5,571 families residing in the city. The racial makeup of the city was 84% White, 3.2% African American, 3.1% Asian, 0.8% American Indian, 10.5% from some other race, and 3.1% from two or more races. 14.4% of the population was Hispanic or Latino of any race.

There were 9,812 households, of which 31.1% had children under the age of 18 living with them, 40.0% were married couples living together, 5.3% had a male householder with no wife present, 11.5% had a female householder with no husband present, and 43.2% were non-families. 32.1% of all households were made up of individuals, and 9.0% had someone living alone who was 65 years of age or older. The average household size was 2.39, and the average family size was 3.08.

In the city, the population was spread out, with 23.5% under the age of 18, 19.7% from 18 to 24, 24.5% from 25 to 44, 20.9% from 45 to 64, and 11.4% who were 65 years of age or older. The median age was 29.0 years. For every 100 females, there were 93.0 males. For every 100 females age 18 and over, there were 89.8 males age 18 and over.

The median income for a household in the city was $34,443, and the median income for a family was $47,500. Males had a median income of $32,873 versus $25,821 for females. The per capita income for the city was $17,485. About 12.0% of families and 22.2% of the population were below the poverty line, including 22.9% of those under age 18 and 11.9% of those age 65 or over.

Economy
In addition to Emporia State University and other large public-sector employers such as the city and county governments, the public schools, and the county hospital, Emporia has several large private-sector employers. Previously, a Tyson Foods beef-packing plant employed more than 2,400 workers. Hostess Brands has a bakery in Emporia. Hopkins Manufacturing Corporation, founded in Emporia in 1953, by E.L. "Bud" Hopkins, and recognized in 2003 as the city's Large Employer of the Year, makes products for the automotive aftermarket. The Braum dairy store chain, based in Oklahoma City, originated in Emporia in 1952 under the name Peter Pan. Simmons Pet Food operates a multi-acre plant in Emporia that manufactures wet dog food.

On January 25, 2008, Tyson unexpectedly announced the layoff of 1,500 workers (more than 60 percent) by March 25, 2008.  The company said it needed to move its slaughter operations closer to where the cattle are raised in western Kansas.  As the city's largest employer for 37 years, the Tyson plant creates almost 10 percent of the local economy.

Education

Colleges and Universities
Emporia is home to Emporia State University and Flint Hills Technical College.  From 1882 to 1974, the private College of Emporia previously existed, and since the city had two colleges during its early years, it was sometimes called the "Athens of Kansas."

Primary and secondary
The community is served by Emporia USD 253 public school district, which has one high school (Emporia High School), one middle school, and six elementary schools, as well as an early childhood center.

The community is also served by two private schools: Emporia Christian School (preschool-8th grade) and Sacred Heart Catholic School (preschool-5th grade).

Library
The Emporia Public Library, has been in operation since 1869 and is the oldest in the state of Kansas to remain in operation.

Transportation

Air
The city is served by the Emporia Municipal Airport.

Bus
Bus service within the city is provided by LCAT, or Lyon County Area Transportation. The agency provides fixed-route bus service to the city of Emporia and paratransit service to the disabled and the rest of Lyon County. The buses are a service of Lyon County, with significant support coming from the Kansas Department of Transportation. The Greyhound Lines has a bus stop in Emporia.

Highway

Train
The former Southern Transcon main line of BNSF Railway (ex-Santa Fe) passes east-west through Emporia. A yard is located in Emporia.

The city was served by Santa Fe passenger trains until the creation of Amtrak in 1971. The daily Southwest Chief served the city from 1971–1997. Service to Emporia station was eliminated in 1997, two years before a fire destroyed the 1884-built station. In 2014, local efforts were started to bring back the station.  the future of revitalized service and a new station is still uncertain.

Media

The Emporia Gazette is the city's main newspaper, published six days a week. The Gazette also publishes a Spanish language monthly paper, La Voz. Emporia State University publishes a bi-weekly student newspaper, the Emporia State University Bulletin.

Emporia is a center of broadcast media for east-central Kansas. One AM radio station and ten FM radio stations are licensed to and/or broadcast from the city. Emporia is in the Topeka, Kansas television market, and one television station, a translator of the Fox affiliate in Topeka, broadcasts from the city.

Culture

Points of interest
Emporia has 14 structures on the National Register of Historic Places. They are the Old Emporia Public Library, the Finney (Warren Wesley) House, the Granada Theater (also known as the Fox Theater), the Harris-Borman House, the Howe (Richard) House, the Keebler-Stone House, the Kress Building, the Mason (Walt) House, the Anderson Carnegie Memorial Library, the Plumb (Mrs. Preston B.) House, the Soden's Grove Bridge, the Soden (Hallie B.) House,  the William Allen White House (also known as Red Rocks), and the Col. Harrison C. and Susan Cross House.
There is also an authentic one-room school house located on the Emporia State University campus (near Merchant Street) that is available for tours through the ESU Teachers College and The National Teachers Hall of Fame.

At the Emporia service area of the Kansas Turnpike is a Kansas Historical Marker named Emporia - Home of William Allen White.

Events
 "Unbound Gravel" (formerly Dirty Kanza) is a gravel bicycle race through the Flint Hills, starting and ending in Emporia. There are race events for 25, 50, 100, 200, 350 miles. It is held every first weekend after Memorial Day.
 "Dynamic Discs Open" is one of the largest disc golf tournaments.
 "The Taste" gives people the chance to visit with wineries, breweries and distilleries from all across Kansas and to taste their products
 "Great American Market" is a large market in downtown Emporia held on the second Saturday each September – vendors of antiques, collectibles, artwork, crafts, and food.

In popular culture
The 1987 CBS miniseries Murder Ordained was filmed in Emporia. It dramatized an actual event in Emporia involving the 1983 death of Sandra Bird. Her husband, Rev. Tom Bird, was convicted of first-degree murder in her death and served 20 years in prison.

Notable people

Notable individuals who were born in and/or have lived in Emporia include actor R. Lee Ermey, journalist William Allen White, and college basketball coach Dean Smith.

See also
 June 1974 Great Plains tornado outbreak
 Great Flood of 1951

References

Further reading

External links

 
 Emporia - Directory of Public Officials
 Emporia Area Chamber of Commerce
 Emporia Convention & Visitors Bureau
 Lyon County History Center & Historical Society
 Highway maps: Emporia city map, Lyon County map (includes Emporia), Kansas map.

 
Cities in Kansas
County seats in Kansas
Cities in Lyon County, Kansas
Populated places established in 1857
Emporia, Kansas micropolitan area
1857 establishments in Kansas Territory